In qualifying for the 2007 Rugby World Cup, there is one place available for African teams, and one place in the repechage. In the group rounds, there are three points awarded for a win, two for a draw, and one for a loss. There are no bonus points awarded.

Qualification process

Round 1a
Two groups of three teams each, winners of each group playoff for one place in Africa Round 1b.

Round 1b
Two groups of three teams each, winners of each group qualify for Africa Round 2, second placed teams playoff for the remaining place in Africa Round 2.

Round 2
Two groups of three teams each, winners of each group qualify for Africa Round 3.

Round 3
Playoff of the winners of each group in Round 2, winner qualifies for World Cup as Africa 1, Runner up advances to the Repechage Round as Africa 2, to play Europe 4.

Round 1a

Northern Pool
Senegal advance to playoff.

Final Standings

Southern Pool
Zambia advance to playoff.

Final Standings

Playoff
Winner advances to Round 1b (Senegal)

Senegal win 35-20 on aggregate

Round 1b

Pool A
Ivory Coast qualifies to Round 2, Zimbabwe advance to playoff.

Final Standings

Pool B
Kenya qualifies to Round 2, Uganda advance to playoff.

Final Standings

Playoff
Winner advances to Round 2 (Uganda)

Uganda win 36-31 on aggregate

Round 2
Home AND Away basis.

Pool 1
Winner (Namibia) qualifies to Round 3.

Final Standings

Pool 2
Winner (Morocco) qualifies to Round 3.

Final Standings

Round 3 – 2006
Winner (Namibia) qualifies direct to RWC 2007 as Africa 1. Runner up (Morocco) advances to the Repechage Round as Africa 2, to play Europe 4, the winner playing Americas 4 for Repechage 1. 

Namibia win 52-15 on aggregate

External links
World Cup website

2007
Africa
2005 in African rugby union
2006 in African rugby union